Morvern ("the sea-gap"), historically also spelt Morven, is a peninsula and traditional district in the Highlands, on the west coast of Scotland. It lies south of the districts of Ardgour and Sunart, and is bounded on the north by Loch Sunart and Glen Tarbert, on the south east by Loch Linnhe and on the south west by the Sound of Mull. The highest point is the summit of the Corbett Creach Bheinn which reaches  in elevation.

Administratively Morvern is now part of the ward management area of Lochaber, in  Highland council area.  It forms part of the traditional shire and current registration county of Argyll.

Prehistory and archaeology 
In 2010, forestry planting by the then Forestry Commission Scotland led to the discovery of a Mesolithic stone tool scatter. Subsequent archaeology excavations also found evidence that people in the Bronze Age also used the same site.

History
Morvern was formerly known as Kinelvadon, which William J. Watson takes to be from Cineal Bhaodain, that is that lands of the Cenél Báetáin, a division of the Cenél Loairn named after Báetán, a putative great-grandson of Loarn mac Eirc. The Senchus fer n-Alban states that "Baotan has twenty houses".

The ruined Ardtornish Castle was in the possession of Somerled in the 12th century and then the Lords of the Isles, whose ownership was recalled in a poem of the same name by Sir Walter Scott. Kinlochaline Castle was once the seat of the MacInnes clan. It was largely destroyed by the army of Oliver Cromwell and restored in 1890.

Before the Highland clearances the population of Morvern was about 2500.

The history of the parish of Morvern in the 19th century has been detailed in Philip Gaskell's Morvern Transformed.

Some residents of St Kilda were relocated to Lochaline, the main village of Morvern, when the island was evacuated in 1930.

On 19th- and early 20th-century Ordnance Survey maps, Morvern is spelled "Morven".

From 1845 to 1975 most of the peninsula formed the civil parish of Morvern. The Kingairloch area in the east formed part of the civil parish of Ardgour. From 1930 to 1975 Morvern formed part of the landward district of Ardnamurchan in Argyll.

Present day
Ferries depart from Lochaline to the Isle of Mull. The Morvern Community Development Company (MCDC), the local development trust, was established in 1999. In 2010 it was announced that MCDC would receive support for a full-time development worker from Highlands and Islands Enterprise.

The closure  of the silica mine at Lochaline was announced in December 2008, with the loss of 11 jobs. Lochaline Quartz Sand Ltd, a joint venture by Minerali Industriali and NSG Pilkington, reopened the mine in September 2012.  
 The mine produces high quality silica sand which is used in the production of solar panels.

Nc’nean distillery is a Scotch whisky distillery in Drimnin on the Morvern peninsular.

Notable people
Duncan McNab, who was born at Achrinich in May 1820, was a Catholic missionary in Queensland and the Kimberley region of Western Australia.

Very Rev Norman Macleod (1838-1911), Moderator of the General Assembly of the Church of Scotland in 1900, was born in the manse at Morvern.

See also
Ardgour
Ardnamurchan
Glensanda
Moidart
Sunart

Notes

References
Gaskell, Philip (1968) Morvern Transformed: A Highland Parish in the Nineteenth Century. Cambridge University Press.
Maclean, Charles (1972) Island on the Edge of the World. Edinburgh. Canongate.
Murray, W.H. (1977) The Companion Guide to the West Highlands of Scotland. London. Collins.

 
Lochaber
Peninsulas of Scotland